is a Japanese film director.

Kaneko's film Ring Wandering won Golden Peacock best film award at 52nd International Film Festival of India in November 2021.

Career
In 2016 Masakazu's first directed-feature The Albino's Trees, was screened as an international premiere in the Beijing International Film Festival, China. In 2017 it was also screened in the 4th Figueira Film Art (the Figueira da Foz International Film Festival), Portugal and awarded the Best Feature, Best Direction, Best Picture.

His second feature Ring Wandering (2021) won the Golden Peacock Best Film Award at the 52nd International Film Festival of India (Goa) and the Ecumenical Jury Commendation Award at the 37th Warsaw Film Festival, Poland.

Selected filmography
 The Albino's Trees (アルビノの木) (2016)
 Ring Wandering (リング・ワンダリング) (2021)

Awards and nominations

References

External links

 "kinone film" Masakazu Kaneko Official HP

1978 births
Living people
Japanese film directors